is a  Japanese publisher, anime, tokusatsu and film production company, and sales agent. Founded on April 1, 2003, by Takeichi Honda, its main office is currently located in Ebisu, Tokyo. T.O Entertainment also has offices located in Los Angeles, CA (USA), Seoul (Korea), Singapore, and St. Petersburg (Russia).

T.O Entertainment also consists of a subsidiary publishing company known as TOBOOKS, which publishes primarily in the Japanese language.

Films 
Yasukuni (2007)
King of Tokyo 0 Filme (2008)
Monologues of Universal Transverse Mercatore - Egg Man (2008)
Strait Jacket (2008)
End Call (2008)
RoboGeisha (2009)
The Town Chernobyl Built (Documentary, 2011)
Endless Days (2011)
TSUGARU (2011) (J: Tsugaru 100 Nen Shokudo)
Men's Egg - Summer Beat (J: Men's Egg Drummers) (2011)
Kunoichi Ninpô-chô - Kagenotsuki (2011) 
Dragon Age Animated Film (2012)
Mass Effect: Paragon Lost (2012)

Anime series 
Zettai Shougeki: Platonic Heart (2008)
Macademi Wasshoi! (2008)
Polyphonica (2009)
Umi Monogatari (2009)
Sasameki Koto (2009)
BakaTest (2010)
Legend of the Legendary Heroes (DenYuuDen) (2010)
MM! (2010)
Freezing (2011)
Majikoi! -OH! Samurai Girl- (2012)

DVD 
Parkour (2008)
Noppo-san to Iku Showa Series (2009)
Mucchiri Mura (2010)
Dogura Magura (2011)

Books 
edge～a collection of paintings～ 
Edge2 ～Samurai of the Future～
Warau Buta No Seikatsu by Masahiro Nakatani
Dare Mo Sou Dakedo, Oretachi Ha Shushoku Shinai To Naranai by Yoshinobu Akita
Zetsubo Otoko by Katsumi Shirai
Itsuka Anata Ha Mori Ni Neru by Kei Ooishi
Comiket Shuugeki by Ryo Kawakami
Ashikaga Incident, Matsumoto Sarin Incident by Toshikazu Sugaya/Yoshiyuki Kono
Yoshinobu Akita BOX - Perfect Collection- by Yoshinobu Akita
Chi-go to Maigo no Akai Heart by Yuiga Satoru
The Sandwich Swap by Her Majesty Rania Al Abdullah of Jordan (Japanese Distribution)
Hunter Dark by Yoshinobu Akita

References

External links
Official website 
English website
About Us, English
Publishing website 
TOBOOKS Diary 

Film production companies of Japan
Anime companies
Book publishing companies in Tokyo
Mass media companies established in 2003
Mass media in Tokyo